The Grand Slam of Thoroughbred racing is an informal name for the winning of four major Thoroughbred horse races in one season in the United States. The term has been applied to at least two different configurations of races, both of which include all three races in the Triple Crown – the Kentucky Derby, Preakness Stakes and Belmont Stakes. The fourth race is either the Travers Stakes or the Breeders' Cup Classic.

The first known completed Grand Slam, which pertains only to eligible three-year-old Thoroughbred horses, occurred in 1941 when Whirlaway won the four major races that season (Kentucky Derby, Preakness, Belmont and Travers). 
Winning these four races is also sometimes called the 'superfecta' or 'quadruple crown'.

The other winner of a Grand Slam has been American Pharoah, which won the Triple Crown and the Breeders' Cup Classic, the last of which is not limited to three-year-old Thoroughbreds.

It has been suggested by racing historian Peter Lee that winning all five races (a feat yet to be accomplished) could be considered as the 'Quintuple Crown'.

Background
Travers Stakes configured
The Kentucky Derby, Preakness Stakes and Belmont Stakes constitute the American Triple Crown of thoroughbred horse racing, and since 1919, only 13 horses have accomplished that feat. The Travers Stakes, which follows the Triple Crown races, is the third-ranked race for American three-year-olds according to international classifications, behind only the Kentucky Derby and Belmont Stakes. These four races are the oldest for three-year-olds in the United States, with the Travers (1864) being the oldest, followed by the Belmont (1867), Preakness (1873) and Kentucky Derby (1875). These four races were termed the Grand Slam by racing historian Edward Hotaling when describing a winner of the four races.

Four horses that have won the Triple Crown attempted to complete the Grand Slam. Whirlaway accomplished the feat in 1941, while Gallant Fox (1930), Affirmed (1978) and American Pharoah (2015) came up short in their attempts. Due to the lack of success in winning what is unofficially considered the fourth leg of the Triple Crown, the Travers Stakes has been nicknamed the 'Graveyard of Favorites'. Over the years, 21 three-year-old Thoroughbred horses have won three of the four legs of this configuration of the Grand Slam, with only Whirlaway having accomplished the feat of winning all four.

Breeders' Cup Classic configured
The Breeders' Cup series of year-end championship races began in 1984, with the Breeders' Cup Classic differing from the Triple Crown, other than in its relative newness, in that the location can change each year (similar to golf's major championships, where three of the four venues change each year), and 13 times it has been held at the same venue as a Triple Crown race.

The newly minted term for this configuration of the Grand Slam to describe the four-race sequence was used by sports writer Bob Ehalt of ESPN following American Pharoah's win in the 2015 Belmont Stakes, when owner Ahmed Zayat committed the colt to racing for the remainder of the 2015 season rather than immediately retiring the horse to stud. The concept of the term was used by others, adding to the excitement of American Pharoah’s pursuit. 

The Breeders' Cup Classic, in contrast to the races in the Triple Crown, is not restricted to any age group and has traditionally been contested by three-, four-, and five-year-old horses. The preliminary use of the term has suggested that a horse would have to win all four races in the same year to claim a Grand Slam title. To do so means that after the Triple Crown, the horse would have to compete against, and defeat, older, more physically developed and more experienced horses to win the Breeders' Cup Classic. 

American Pharoah is the only horse to attempt both Grand Slam configurations, having lost in his attempt in the Travers Stakes, but winning the Breeders' Cup Classic.

Grand Slam races

Triple Crown series plus Travers Stakes winners

Note: Every thoroughbred horse that won at least three of the four Grand Slam event races was declared American Champion Three-Year-Old Male Horse except Shut Out in 1942 who was overshadowed by Alsab (winner of the Preakness Stakes) for that honor.

Triple Crown series plus Breeders Cup Classic winners

An ongoing challenge for young horses who win races in the Triple Crown series is remaining sound and healthy for future races. In the case of their owners, it can also be difficult to resist the temptation to protect a valuable horse from future risk of injury and retire them early to stud following a major win.

Since the Breeders' Cup Classic was first run in 1984, most of the winners were older than three-year-olds. Overall, fewer than half of the Breeders' Cup Classic winners of any age had entered any of the Triple Crown races when they were three-year-olds. Less than a dozen horses had also won at least one of the Triple Crown series races. Some did not win in the same three-year-old season, but did so as older horses.

Of the few horses to win at least one Triple Crown race and the Classic in the same three-year-old season, the first was Sunday Silence, who won the Derby and the Preakness, and was second in the Belmont. He was the horse who came the closest to winning the Grand Slam prior to American Pharoah's success. The only other horse to win three of the four Grand Slam races was Alysheba, but that horse won the Classic as a four-year-old. Other horses that won a Triple Crown series race and then the Classic in their three-year-old season include: Unbridled, A. P. Indy, Curlin and Authentic. Unbridled and Curlin contested the Classic again as four-year-olds, but did not win.

Of special note: Invasor won the 2006 Classic, and had been the 2005 winner of Uruguay's Triple Crown. Invasor won his Triple Crown by November 2005 and won the Classic in the ensuing year (the Uruguay version races through the time period that the Classic is raced, so he swept the three races in 2005 and then finished it off in his first Classic opportunity at four years of age).

[Fy] denotes a filly

[#] denotes winner of two Triple Crown races as 3 year old and Classic as 4 year old

See also
 American thoroughbred racing top attended events
Grand Slam of Grass
Grand Slam (horse)
Superfecta (betting)

References

Breeders' Cup
Racing series for horses
Triple Crown of Thoroughbred Racing